Harriet Raikes was the daughter of Thomas Raikes the Younger, a merchant and banker in London, and the granddaughter of Thomas Raikes the Elder, also merchant and banker in London and Governor of the Bank of England from 1797 to 1799.

Her father became a famous dandy traveller in Europe,  meeting the highest celebrities of his times and he was also a diarist. In 1861 Harriet edited her father's correspondence with the 2nd Duke of Wellington.

She was also the author of The Marriage Contract (London: Richard Bentley, 1849, 2 vols), which is the first recorded murder mystery novel in English by a woman.

Writers from London
English biographers
19th-century English novelists
Year of birth missing
Year of death missing